Mareshk (also Romanized as Māreshk; also known as Marshak and Marūshk) is a village in Kardeh Rural District, in the Central District of Mashhad County, Razavi Khorasan Province, Iran. At the 2006 census, its population was 1,532, in 334 families.

References 

Populated places in Mashhad County